Darius Denayr Bazley (born June 12, 2000) is an American professional basketball player for the Phoenix Suns of the National Basketball Association (NBA). He attended Princeton High School in Sharonville, Ohio after playing his first two years at Finneytown High School. He was a consensus five-star recruit and the top prospect in his state, earning McDonald's All-American honors in 2018. 

Bazley initially committed to and signed with Syracuse but later chose to bypass college with intentions of joining the NBA G League, a decision that drew national attention. However, he instead chose to train independently as an intern for New Balance throughout the season leading up to the 2019 NBA draft. In the draft, he was selected 23rd overall by the Utah Jazz before immediately being traded to the Memphis Grizzlies and then to the Oklahoma City Thunder. Bazley spent four seasons with the Thunder before being traded to the Phoenix Suns in 2023.

High school career
Bazley began playing high school basketball at Finneytown High School in Springfield Township, Ohio. He was ruled ineligible for the first half of his freshman season. As a sophomore, Bazley started drawing interest from several college programs, including Ohio State and West Virginia. On December 19, 2015, he posted 25 points, 15 rebounds, and 5 blocks against Woodward High School. After averaging 15.8 points, 12.4 rebounds, 3.8 assists, 2.4 blocks and 1.5 steals, he was named to the Division III Southwest Ohio all-district second team.

Entering his junior campaign, Bazley was the top-ranked player in Ohio. In July 2016, it was announced that he would transfer to Princeton High School in Sharonville, Ohio. He was sidelined for his first 11 games because of transfer rules. In August, Bazley committed to Ohio State, being rated a four-star recruit by 247Sports at the time. On January 11, 2017, he debuted for Princeton, recording 11 points, 10 rebounds, 5 assists, and 3 steals in a loss at the Flyin' To The Hoop Invitational. In April, Bazley announced his de-commitment from Ohio State due to his desire for a "bigger stage." About two months later, he committed to Syracuse, and in November, he signed a letter of intent. On January 16, 2018, in his senior season, Bazley was named to the West team for the 2018 McDonald's All-American Boys Game. On January 19, he led his Princeton team with 24 points in a nationally televised game against top recruit Romeo Langford and New Albany High School. Bazley also took part in the Jordan Brand Classic and Nike Hoop Summit in April.

Professional career
On March 30, 2018, Bazley announced that he would skip college with plans to join the NBA G League directly from high school. In April, he hired sports agent Rich Paul of Klutch Sports Group. Syracuse head coach Jim Boeheim, who Bazley was expected to play under in college before the move, responded, "I hope he does great. But I don't think it's the way it will be. I think it will be proven it's not the way to get to the NBA." On August 27, Bazley announced that he would drop his G League plans altogether, opting instead to train on his own for the season. On October 25, he began a three-month internship with New Balance worth $1 million. After concluding his internship, Bazley became one of the first players to enter the 2019 NBA draft, later being named one of 77 overall prospects invited to the 2019 NBA Draft Combine.

Oklahoma City Thunder (2019–2023) 
Bazley was drafted 23rd overall by the Utah Jazz but was traded to the Memphis Grizzlies, who then traded him to the Oklahoma City Thunder. On November 15, 2019, Bazley made his NBA debut, recording five points in a 127–119 overtime win over the Philadelphia 76ers. On August 9, 2020, he scored a season-high 23 points, along with seven rebounds, in a 121–103 win over the Washington Wizards.

On April 19, 2021, Bazley logged a season-high 26 points, along with seven rebounds and three assists, in a 107–119 loss to the Washington Wizards. Two days later, he matched this total alongside nine rebounds in a 116–122 loss to the Indiana Pacers.

On March 13, 2022, Bazley recorded a career-high 29 points, along with ten rebounds, in a 118–125 loss to the Memphis Grizzlies. On March 28, he was ruled out for the remainder of the 2021–22 season with a tibial plateau fracture in his right knee.

Phoenix Suns (2023–present) 
On February 9, 2023, Bazley was traded to the Phoenix Suns in exchange for Dario Šarić, a 2029 second-round pick and cash considerations.

Career statistics

NBA

Regular season

|-
| style="text-align:left;"| 
| style="text-align:left;"| Oklahoma City
| 61 || 9 || 18.5 || .394 || .348 || .694 || 4.0 || .7 || .4 || .7 || 5.6
|-
| style="text-align:left;"| 
| style="text-align:left;"| Oklahoma City
| 55 || 55 || 31.2 || .396 || .290 || .702 || 7.2 || 1.8 || .5 || .5 || 13.7
|-
| style="text-align:left;"| 
| style="text-align:left;"| Oklahoma City
| 69 || 53 || 27.9 || .422 || .297 || .688 || 6.3 || 1.4 || .8 || 1.0 || 10.8
|-
| style="text-align:left;"| 
| style="text-align:left;"| Oklahoma City
| 36 || 1 || 15.4 || .449 || .400 || .554 || 3.4 || .9 || .5 || .8 || 5.4
|- class="sortbottom"
| style="text-align:center;" colspan="2"| Career
| 221 || 118 || 24.1 || .410 || .310 || .676 || 5.4 || 1.2 || .6 || .7 || 9.2

Playoffs

|-
| style="text-align:left;"| 2020
| style="text-align:left;"| Oklahoma City
| 7 || 0 || 18.0 || .419 || .500 || .900 || 6.7 || .9 || .0 || .4 || 6.6
|- class="sortbottom"
| style="text-align:center;" colspan="2"| Career
| 7 || 0 || 18.0 || .419 || .500 || .900 || 6.7 || .9 || .0 || .4 || 6.6

References

External links
USA Basketball bio

2000 births
 Living people
 American men's basketball players
 Basketball players from Boston
 Basketball players from Cincinnati
 McDonald's High School All-Americans
 Oklahoma City Thunder players
 Phoenix Suns players
 Power forwards (basketball)
 Small forwards
 Utah Jazz draft picks